Lonnie Lee Maclin (born February 17, 1967) is a former Major League Baseball left fielder. Maclin played for the St. Louis Cardinals in the 1993 season. In 12 career games, Maclin had one hit in 13 at-bats. He batted and threw left-handed.

Career
Maclin attended Ritenour High School of St. Louis, where at various times he played baseball, basketball, and football, wrestled, and ran track. He was drafted by the Cardinals in the 3rd round of the 1986 amateur draft.

Maclin attributes his failure to catch on with the Cardinals in part to an organizational preference for power hitters, when he was a self-described "slap hitter."

In July 1995, the Rio Grande Valley White Wings traded Maclin to the Amarillo Dillas in exchange for third baseman Mike Fernandez. Maclin would go on to play for the Dillas in every season though 2001. He served as player-manager in 2001, and served as manager only the following season. The Amarillo Globe-News, the paper of record for the city, described him as "one of the all-time great Dillas players".

In his free time, Maclin enjoyed performing stand-up comedy.

References

External links

1967 births
Living people
Amarillo Dillas players
American expatriate baseball players in Mexico
Arkansas Travelers players
Baseball players from Missouri
Jackson Senators players
Johnson City Cardinals players
Louisville Redbirds players
Major League Baseball left fielders
Mexican League baseball outfielders
Minor league baseball managers
Olmecas de Tabasco players
Rio Grande Valley WhiteWings players
Rojos del Águila de Veracruz players
Savannah Cardinals players
Springfield Cardinals players
St. Louis Cardinals players
St. Petersburg Cardinals players
STLCC Archers baseball players